= Matteo Mainardi =

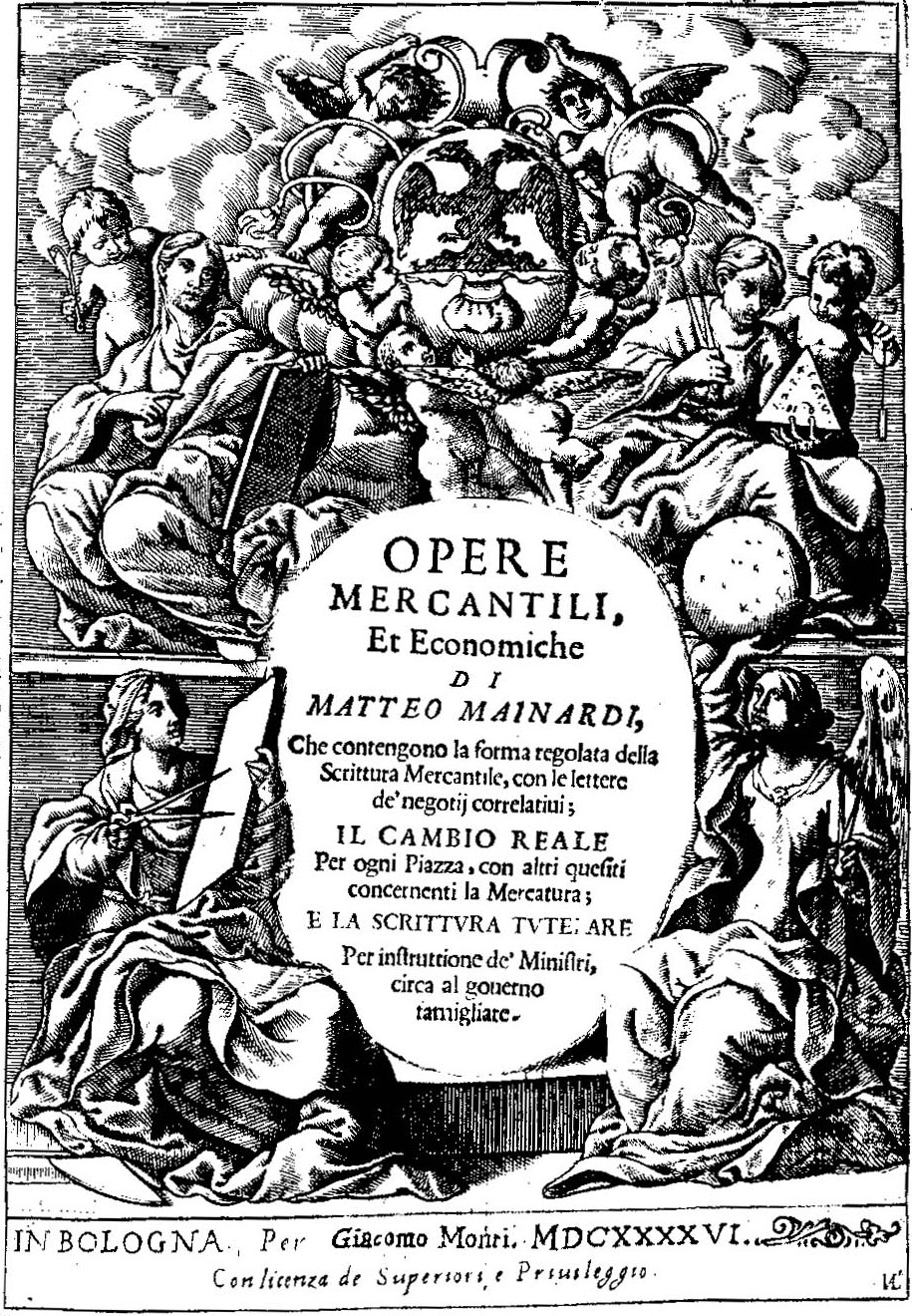
Opere mercantili et economiche, 1646

Matteo Mainardi (Bologna, late 16th century – after 1646) was an Italian economist and arithmetician.

== Life ==
Born in Bologna, he is known for having done the history of the bookkeeping in Italy in the 17th century, along with Antonio Maria Villavecchia, Ambrogio Lerici, Giovanni Domenico Peri, Simon Grisogono, Giovanni Antonio Moschetti, Lodovico Flori, and others. He wrote many books about bookkeeping, and a history of the origin of every church in Bologna. All of his works were reprinted in 1700 in Bologna by Longhi. His 1632 work La scrittura mercantile formatamente regolata is considered particularly relevant.

== Works ==
- Matteo Mainardi (1632). La scrittura mercantile formatamente regolata (in Italian). Bologna: Per Giacomo Monti.
- Matteo Mainardi (1633). Origine e fondatione di tutte le chiese che di presente si trovano nella città di Bologna (in Italian). Bologna: presso Clemente Ferroni.
- Matteo Mainardi (1638). Il Cambio reale per ogni Piazza (in Italian). Bologna.
- Matteo Mainardi (1641). L'economo; overo, La scrittura tutelare (in Italian). Bologna: Tebaldini.
- Mainardi, Matteo (1646). Opere mercantili et economiche (in Italian). Bologna: Giacomo Monti.
- Matteo Mainardi (1700). L'economo; overo, La scrittura tutelare (in Italian). Bologna: per il Longhi.

== Bibliography ==
- Journal of accountancy. American Association of Public Accountants. 1929. p. 209.
- Massa, Giovanni (1907). Trattato completo de' ragioneria (in Italian). Vol. XII. pp. 223, 576.
- Luigi Serra (1999). Storia della ragioneria italiana (in Italian). Giuffrè. pp. 215–. ISBN 9788814074288.
